Charles Anton "Tony" Smith (born June 14, 1968) is an American retired professional basketball player.

Smith played high school basketball at Wauwatosa East High School, which retired his number 34 jersey at ceremonies held in 2007. He then played basketball at the collegiate level for  Marquette University from 1986 to 1990.  During his time at Marquette he set the schools all time record for points per game , 23.8  which he achieved during the 1989-90 season. Smiths scoring record was eclipsed by Markus Howard in the 2018-19 season. Smith graduated with a degree in Mechanical Engineering and Organizational Leadership . He was inducted into Marquette's Hall of Fame in September 2006.

He was selected with the 24th pick of the 2nd round in the 1990 NBA draft by the Los Angeles Lakers. He played with six different NBA teams from 1990 to 2001, and last played in 2002 with the Phoenix Eclipse of the American Basketball Association.

In 2016, he began working as an analyst and studio host for broadcasts of Milwaukee Bucks basketball on Fox Sports Wisconsin. In 2018 Smith became the radio color analyst for Marquette University Basketball.

Career statistics

NBA

Regular season

|-
| align="left" | 1990–91
| align="left" | L. A. Lakers
| 64 || 1 || 10.9 || .441 || .000 || .702 || 1.1 || 2.1 || 0.4 || 0.2 || 3.7
|-
| align="left" | 1991–92
| align="left" | L. A. Lakers
| 63 || 0 || 13.0 || .399 || .000 || .653 || 1.2 || 1.7 || 0.6 || 0.1 || 4.4
|-
| align="left" | 1992–93
| align="left" | L. A. Lakers
| 55 || 9 || 13.7 || .484 || .182 || .756 || 1.6 || 1.1 || 0.9 || 0.1 || 6.0
|-
| align="left" | 1993–94
| align="left" | L. A. Lakers
| 73 || 31 || 22.2 || .441 || .320 || .714 || 2.7 || 2.0 || 0.8 || 0.2 || 8.8
|-
| align="left" | 1994–95
| align="left" | L. A. Lakers
| 61 || 4 || 16.8 || .427 || .352 || .698 || 1.8 || 1.7 || 0.8 || 0.1 || 5.6
|-
| align="left" | 1995–96
| align="left" | Phoenix
| 34 || 2 || 15.5 || .405 || .325 || .649 || 1.6 || 2.5 || 0.6 || 0.1 || 5.6
|-
| align="left" | 1995–96
| align="left" | Miami
| 25 || 1 || 16.4 || .455 || .333 || .444 || 1.6 || 2.7 || 0.6 || 0.2 || 4.4
|-
| align="left" | 1996–97
| align="left" | Charlotte
| 69 || 39 || 18.7 || .409 || .323 || .644 || 1.4 || 2.2 || 0.7 || 0.3 || 5.0
|-
| align="left" | 1997–98
| align="left" | Milwaukee
| 7 || 0 || 11.4 || .333 || .000 || .750 || 1.0 || 1.4 || 0.7 || 0.3 || 2.7
|-
| align="left" | 2000–01
| align="left" | Atlanta
| 6 || 0 || 13.0 || .348 || .000 || .500 || 0.5 || 1.7 || 1.2 || 0.0 || 2.8
|- class="sortbottom"
| style="text-align:center;" colspan="2"| Career
| 457 || 87 || 16.0 || .431 || .307 || .690 || 1.6 || 1.9 || 0.7 || 0.2 || 5.5
|}

Playoffs

|-
| align="left" | 1990–91
| align="left" | L. A. Lakers
| 7 || 0 || 5.7 || .462 || .000 || .667 || 0.4 || 0.3 || 0.1 || 0.0 || 2.0
|-
| align="left" | 1991–92
| align="left" | L. A. Lakers
| 4 || 0 || 10.0 || .300 || .000 || .500 || 0.5 || 1.3 || 1.0 || 0.0 || 1.8
|-
| align="left" | 1992–93
| align="left" | L. A. Lakers
| 5 || 0 || 14.6 || .520 || .500 || .667 || 1.6 || 0.4 || 0.2 || 0.2 || 6.8
|-
| align="left" | 1994–95
| align="left" | L. A. Lakers
| 6 || 0 || 4.5 || .231 || .300 || .000 || 0.5 || 0.5 || 0.0 || 0.0 || 1.5
|-
| align="left" | 1995–96
| align="left" | Miami
| 3 || 0 || 20.3 || .474 || .400 || .000 || 1.3 || 2.7 || 1.3 || 0.0 || 7.3
|-
| align="left" | 1996–97
| align="left" | Charlotte
| 2 || 0 || 4.5 || .000 || .000 || .500 || 0.5 || 1.0 || 0.5 || 0.0 || 0.5
|- class="sortbottom"
| style="text-align:center;" colspan="2"| Career
| 27 || 0 || 9.3 || .420 || .333 || .556 || 0.8 || 0.8 || 0.4 || 0.0 || 3.2
|}

College

|-
| align="left" | 1986–87
| align="left" | Marquette
| 29 || 24 || 24.9 || .534 || .333 || .753 || 3.3 || 2.1 || 1.4 || 0.4 || 8.0
|-
| align="left" | 1987–88
| align="left" | Marquette
| 28 || - || 31.9 || .523 || .368 || .739 || 4.5 || 2.9 || 1.9 || 0.6 || 13.1
|-
| align="left" | 1988–89
| align="left" | Marquette
| 28 || 28 || 32.4 || .556 || .667 || .730 || 3.9 || 5.6 || 1.6 || 0.4 || 14.2
|-
| align="left" | 1989–90
| align="left" | Marquette
| 29 || - || 39.0 || .495 || .414 || .856 || 4.7 || 5.8 || 1.8 || 0.6 || 23.8
|- class="sortbottom"
| style="text-align:center;" colspan="2"| Career
| 114 || 52 || 32.4 || .521 || .430 || .785 || 4.1 || 4.1 || 1.7 || 0.5 || 14.8
|}

References

External links
 NBA.com profile
 NBA stats @ basketballreference.com

1968 births
Living people
African-American basketball players
American expatriate basketball people in the Dominican Republic
American expatriate basketball people in Italy
American expatriate basketball people in Spain
American men's basketball players
Atlanta Hawks players
Basketball players from Wisconsin
Charlotte Hornets players
Liga ACB players
Los Angeles Lakers draft picks
Los Angeles Lakers players
Marquette Golden Eagles men's basketball players
Miami Heat players
Milwaukee Bucks players
People from Wauwatosa, Wisconsin
Phoenix Suns players
Point guards
Rockford Lightning players
Shooting guards
Sportspeople from the Milwaukee metropolitan area
21st-century African-American people
20th-century African-American sportspeople